Amin al-Hindi (1940 – August 17, 2010) was an intelligence chief of the Palestinian Authority. Hindi was a leader of the Black September militant movement and was suspected of involvement in the Munich massacre at the 1972 Summer Olympics that resulted in the deaths of 11 Israeli athletes and coaches.

Hindi was born in Gaza in 1940 and was actively involved with Yasir Arafat in the Fatah movement that Arafat created in the 1950s.

In its obituary, The New York Times described Hindi as being "widely suspected of having played an organizing role" in the Black September attack in Munich that led to the deaths of 11 athletes and coaches representing the Israeli Olympic team at the 1972 Summer Games who had been taken as hostages at the Olympic village on the morning of September 5, 1972. Israeli security forces carried out a series of killings of individuals believed to have been involved with the massacre. Hindi never acknowledged his involvement in the attack and may have been the last living person involved with plotting the attack following the death of Abu Daoud, the Palestinian militant known as the planner, architect and mastermind of the Munich massacre.

Israel permitted him to return from exile in the 1990s following the Oslo Accords. He became a senior official in the Palestinian Authority and served as commander of the Palestinian General Security and Intelligence Service until 2005. In that role he had frequent contact with Israeli military and security forces.

The Palestinian news agency Wafa reported that al-Hindi had died at age 70 on August 17, 2010, in Amman, Jordan, due to liver cancer and pancreatic cancer. His body was transported from Jordan to the West Bank where ceremonies honoring him were held at the presidential headquarters of Mahmoud Abbas. His body was then transferred through Israel for burial in Gaza. His Gaza funeral was attended by members of the Fatah Central Committee and the Fatah Revolutionary Council. A procession traveled from his home in the Al-Rimal neighborhood to the Katiba Mosque.

References

1940 births
2010 deaths
Deaths from cancer in Jordan
Deaths from liver cancer
Deaths from pancreatic cancer
Fatah military commanders
Members of the Black September Organization
Munich massacre
People from Gaza City
Palestinian militants
Palestinian military personnel
Arab people of Indian descent
India–State of Palestine relations